Henry Barber may refer to:

Henry Barber (cricketer) (1841–1924), English cricketer
Henry Barber (rock climber) (born 1953), American rock climber
Henry Barber (sea captain) (18th century), British sea captain who discovered McKean Island
Sir Henry Barber, 1st Baronet (1860–1927), British property developer